Sega Soccer Slam, also known as simply Soccer Slam, is a sports game released for GameCube, Xbox, and PlayStation 2 in 2002.

Gameplay
Sega Soccer Slam is different from traditional sports games in its exaggerated interpretation of soccer. It allows characters to punch one another and eliminates several other rules, such as throw-ins, corner kicks, free kicks, and penalties. Sega Soccer Slam includes an exhibition mode, a challenge mode, a practice mode, a tourney mode, and a quest mode. It also includes two minigames: Hot Potato and Brawl.

Practice mode is a step-by-step instruction of how to play the game, teaching the player maneuvers including steals, passes, shots, dekes, volleys, as well as more complicated moves such as spotlight shot and the killer kick (an incredibly powerful shot that can be accessed when the charge bottom at the bottom of the screen reaches its maximum through doing basic moves). The practice mode is essential for both masters and newcomers to prepare for the exhibition, tourney, challenge and quest parts of the game.

The exhibition mode is similar to that of most other sport games. In it, players are allowed to choose their opponent and team as well as a stadium to play in. They can also play two mini-games with up to four players: Brawl, which is where four of the characters fight against each other, and Hot Potato, a game where passing scores points, but when the ball explodes, anyone in the blast will lose points. Tourney mode is where the player can play in a tournament that lasts for 5 days of each team playing each other at least once through the competition.  Challenge mode is when the player creates a custom team and compete in a series of matches to unlock nine secret characters, but each character can only unlock two secret characters.

Other than the gameplay options said above, Sega Soccer Slam also has a quest mode. In quest mode the player chooses one of the starting six teams and then competes in a series of ten games. Through winning these games the player can accumulate money which can be used to buy character art and power-up items. The character wears each item in order to enhance his or her attributes.

Teams
Team Toxic: Colored mainly green.  The major team members consists of Raine, a Canadian eco-terrorist; Duke, a burly American football player; and Nova, a young Native American genius who wants to win the championship so that he can aid in making soccer possible on a space station. The characters come from Northern America and best at passes. The Reactor Core is their home field.
Team Volta: Mostly clad in yellow.  The team is based from western and southern Europe containing the members Angus, a Scottish boxer; Dante, an Italian pretty boy; and Arsenault (known also as "The grandfather of Thierry Henry)", a sarcastic Frenchman. The team is best at speed, and their home field is Riviera Ruins.
Team Subzero: A team from east and northern Europe, clad in white and ice-blue, with members such as Half-Pint, a British soccer hooligan who wants to cause as much chaos on the pitch; Lola, a German raver; and Kiril, a Russian soldier. The team's home field is Alpen Castle, and the team is best at hitting their opponents.
Team Spirit: Their clothing and body paint is purple.  The main team members include Zari, a soccer star from Nigeria; Kaimani, a laid-back surfer from South Africa; and Djimon, a mysterious shaman hailing from Kenya. The team is based from Africa and is best at high shot combos. Their home field is the Tribal Oasis.
Team Tsunami: An ocean blue decorates this team.  The team's major members are Kahuna, a daredevil from Hawaii; Rumiko, the Japanese geneticist who made Team Robo; and Boomer, an overweight gator-wrestler from the Australian Outback; all three hail from the Pacific Rim. The team is notable for their accuracy in shooting, and their home field is the Pacific Atoll.
Team El Fuego:  In fiery red, El Fuego, (Spanish for The Fire) is composed of Mexican wrestler El Diablo, Argentine soccer superstar Rico, and Brazilian martial artist Madeira. The Latin American-based team is well balanced as well as very aggressive. Their home field is the Jungle Canopy.

There are 3 teams that can be unlocked in the challenge mode:
Team Love: A group of three girls who are clad in pink. Tomboy Marla, prissy Nadia and show-off Petra. They joined Sega Soccer Slam in attempt to meet their idol, Lola. Dante tried to get them to be with him, he gave them candy hearts but they ate so many they got the power of Cupid's warriors, the power known as Hartbreaker. But Dante didn't get the girls. They are faster than Volta.
Team Robo: Three robots that were made by Rumiko - Heartbroken troublemaker Pi, cowboy Diode and super-Intelligent Mecha. Rumiko tried inventing them so she could have robots whom enhanced human emotions, but they failed. Rumiko tried exterminating them but nothing worked because her robots were invincible. Now Team Robo wants to destroy their evil stepmother once and for all. All three of them have the same stats, and are better at shooting than Tsunami.
Team Ohm: Powerful gold team of three men: A Burmese ex-rebel leader Dakai, a Chinese martial arts master Damo, and an Indian dizzy soccer-loving chef Jishen. They all come from Southeast Asia. Dakai was secretly practicing alchemy in a dastardly attempt to create the golden elixir of immortality. Dakai managed to create a superhuman power for his team, but didn't dare tell Jishen or Damo what he had done. Similar to team El Fuego, but with super hitting and shooting.

Reception

The GameCube and Xbox versions received "favorable" reviews, while the PS2 version received "average" reviews, according to the review aggregation website Metacritic. AllGame gave the GameCube original three stars out of five, stating, "Outlandish costumes, ridiculous accents, and goofy expressions are wrapped around an intuitive control scheme that offers players the flexibility to perform a variety of moves, without making them complicated to perform." In Japan, where said original was ported for release on September 26, 2002, Famitsu gave it a score of 27 out of 40.

GameSpot named Sega Soccer Slams PlayStation 2 version the third-best video game of March 2002, and its Xbox version the best Xbox game of September 2002. It won the publication's annual "Best Game No One Played on GameCube" award, and was nominated in the "Best Alternative Sports Game on GameCube", "Best Alternative Sports Game on Xbox", "Best Graphics (Artistic) on Xbox" and "Best Game No One Played on Xbox" categories.

References

External links
 

2002 video games
Association football video games
GameCube games
Mobile games
PlayStation 2 games
Sega video games
Video games developed in Canada
Xbox games
Xbox Originals games